Robert Pollard (25 August 1899 — after 1933) was an English professional footballer who played as a full back. During his career, he made over 300 appearances in the Football League during spells with Exeter City, Queens Park Rangers and Cardiff City.

Career
Born in Platt Bridge, Pollard began his career playing for local side Platt Bridge United before joining Lancashire Combination side Park Lane. In 1920, he joined Football League side Exeter City and made his professional debut in April 1921 against Luton Town. He went on to make over 250 appearances in all competitions for the club before moving to Queens Park Rangers in 1929.

He moved to Cardiff City in 1932 where he spent one season before joining French club Saint-Étienne.

References

1899 births
Date of death missing
English footballers
Exeter City F.C. players
Queens Park Rangers F.C. players
Cardiff City F.C. players
AS Saint-Étienne players
English Football League players
Association football fullbacks